Caribe Atómico is the fourth studio album by Colombian rock duo Aterciopelados. Released in 1998 it was nominated for a Grammy for Best Latin Rock/Alternative Performance  in 1999.

Track listing

References

External links

1998 albums
Aterciopelados albums
Sony BMG albums